The Crash Reel is a documentary film directed by Lucy Walker which premiered as the Opening Night Gala film on 19 January 2013 at the Sundance Film Festival.

Through 20 years of sports and verite footage, The Crash Reel chronicles the rivalry between Kevin Pearce and Shaun White which culminates in Kevin's life-changing crash and later comeback. The film also showcases the Pearce family, including Kevin's father glass-blower Simon Pearce and Kevin's brother David C. Pearce who describes his struggle to accept his Down syndrome.

The film also premiered at the X Games on January 23, 2013 in Aspen as the first ever movie to play as a featured part of the event.

Soundtrack 
Transcribed from the ending credits.

References 

http://filmguide.sundance.org/film/13077/the_crash_reel
http://www.hollywoodreporter.com/review/crash-reel-sundance-review-414027
http://sportsillustrated.cnn.com/2013/more/wires/01/18/2080.ap.sbd.kevin.pearce.documentary.1st.ld.writethru.1471/index.html
http://xgames.espn.go.com/video/8850977/crash-reel

External links
 

2013 films
2013 documentary films
American sports documentary films
Snowboarding films
Documentary films about Down syndrome
Documentary films about winter sports
Phase 4 Films films
HBO documentary films
Films directed by Lucy Walker
2010s English-language films
2010s American films